Jason Peter Cook (born 29 December 1969) is an English former footballer who played in the Football League as a midfielder for Southend United and Colchester United.

Career

Cook, born in Edmonton, London, was on the books at Tottenham Hotspur as a youth, but failed to progress to the first-team. In June 1989, he joined Southend United, spending two years with the Shrimpers and making 30 appearances, scoring one goal.

In July 1991, Cook joined Conference side and Essex rivals Colchester United. He made 31 appearances in a season where the U's were promoted back to the Football League at the second time of asking, scoring two goals. On 28 September 1991, he made his Colchester debut in a famous 2–1 away victory against rivals Wycombe Wanderers, a game where Colchester's goalkeeper Scott Barrett scored an 89th-minute winner from a long upfield punt. Cook had come on as a 69th-minute substitute for Mark Kinsella. He scored his first goal in a 3–1 home victory over Welling United on 23 November Colchester also reached the FA Trophy final, a match which they won 3–1 over Witton Albion. Cook was sent off in the match, and in turn was unable to collect a winners medal. However, unused substitute in the game Eamonn Collins handed Cook his winners medal. With Colchester back in the Football League, Cook made a further 35 appearances and scored one goal before moving on to Dagenham & Redbridge in 1993. He also played for Chelmsford City and Braintree Town.

Honours
Colchester United
1991–92 Football Conference winner (Level 5)
1991–92 FA Trophy winner

All honours referenced by:

References

1969 births
Living people
Footballers from Edmonton, London
English footballers
Association football midfielders
Tottenham Hotspur F.C. players
Southend United F.C. players
Colchester United F.C. players
Dagenham & Redbridge F.C. players
Chelmsford City F.C. players
Braintree Town F.C. players
English Football League players
National League (English football) players